Brankica Mihajlović (born 13 April 1991) is a Serbian professional volleyball player. She plays for the Serbia women's national volleyball team where she won a silver medal at the 2016 Summer Olympics. She also competed in the 2012 Summer Olympics and the 2017 Women's European Volleyball Championship. In 2019, she returned to the Turkish club Fenerbahçe after a 3 year break.

Career
Mihajlović won the silver medal at the 2013 Club World Championship playing with Unilever Vôlei.

On 28 November 2014 Hisamitsu Springs announced she was joining the team. With this club, she played the 2015 FIVB Club World Championship.

Awards

Individual
2013 World Grand Prix "Best Outside Spiker"
2015 World Cup "Best Outside Spiker"
2016 Olympic Games "Best Outside Spiker"
2017 Yeltsin Cup "Most Valuable Player"
2017 European Championship "Best Outside Spiker"
 2017-2018 Japanese V.League "Excellent Player"
 2018-2019 Japanese V.League "Best Outside Hitter"
 2019 European Championship "Best Outside Spiker"

Clubs
2013 Club World Championship -  Runner-up, with Unilever Vôlei
2013/14 Brazilian Volleyball Superliga -  winner, with Unilever Vôlei
2014/15 Turkish Super Cup -  winner, with Fenerbahçe Grundig
2016/17 Chinese Volleyball League -  The third
2017/2018 Japanese National Championship -  Runner-up, with JT Marvelous

References

External links

 

1991 births
Serbian women's volleyball players
Living people
Olympic volleyball players of Serbia
Volleyball players at the 2012 Summer Olympics
Volleyball players at the 2015 European Games
European Games medalists in volleyball
European Games bronze medalists for Serbia
Serbs of Bosnia and Herzegovina
European champions for Serbia
Volleyball players at the 2016 Summer Olympics
People from Brčko District
Olympic silver medalists for Serbia
Olympic medalists in volleyball
Medalists at the 2016 Summer Olympics
Expatriate volleyball players in France
Expatriate volleyball players in Japan
Expatriate volleyball players in South Korea
Expatriate volleyball players in Switzerland
Expatriate volleyball players in Turkey
Expatriate volleyball players in China
Serbian expatriate sportspeople in Bosnia and Herzegovina
Serbian expatriate sportspeople in Brazil
Serbian expatriate sportspeople in France
Serbian expatriate sportspeople in Japan
Serbian expatriate sportspeople in South Korea
Serbian expatriate sportspeople in Switzerland
Serbian expatriate sportspeople in Turkey
Serbian expatriate sportspeople in China
Fenerbahçe volleyballers
Outside hitters
Volleyball players at the 2020 Summer Olympics
Medalists at the 2020 Summer Olympics
Olympic bronze medalists for Serbia